Chelfham railway station was a station on the Lynton and Barnstaple Railway, a narrow gauge line that ran through Exmoor from Barnstaple to Lynton and Lynmouth in North Devon, England. The station stood at the head of the spectacular Chelfham Viaduct, and served the village of Chelfham below.

History

It opened with the line on 11 May 1898, and closed with it after service on 29 September 1935. From 1923 until closure, the line was operated by the Southern Railway.

The Lynton and Barnstaple Railway Trust bought Chelfham station in 2000 and the station site is currently undergoing restoration while the group operates the railway at Woody Bay as a tourist attraction.

The weatherboard extension, originally built by the Southern Railway to house scales for weighing parcels, was damaged beyond repair by strong winds in 2006.

References

Disused railway stations in Devon
Railway stations in Great Britain opened in 1898
Railway stations in Great Britain closed in 1935
Former Lynton and Barnstaple Railway stations